Luigi Bassi (1833–1871) was an Italian composer and clarinetist.

Bassi was born in Cremona and studied at the Milan Conservatory under Benedetto Carulli from 1846 to 1853. He was the principal clarinetist of La Scala in Milan. He composed a total of 27 works for clarinet. He wrote 15 operatic fantasies for clarinet, most notably Fantaisie brillante on Verdi's 'Rigoletto'.

References

External links
 

1833 births
1871 deaths
Italian clarinetists
Italian male composers
19th-century Italian composers
19th-century Italian male musicians